Hēnare Mōkena Kōhere (10 March 1880 – 16 September 1916) was a New Zealand farmer and soldier. Of Māori, English and French descent, he identified with the Ngāti Porou iwi. He was born in Te Araroa, East Coast, New Zealand, on 10 March 1880. His parents were Hōne Hiki Kōhere and Henerata Bristow (sometimes noted as Peretō), and his grandfather was Mōkena Kōhere. His eldest brother was Rēweti Kōhere. Hēnare Kōhere fought as an officer in the First World War and died of wounds in France on 16 September 1916.

References

1880 births
1916 deaths
New Zealand farmers
People from Te Araroa
Ngāti Porou people
New Zealand Māori soldiers
Halbert-Kohere family
New Zealand military personnel killed in World War I